Ali Al-Shareef (born 1989), is a Libyan professional footballer who currently plays for Al-Hilal.

References

External links
 Ali Al-Shareef at Goalzz.com

Libyan footballers
1989 births
Living people
Association football forwards
Libyan expatriate footballers
Libyan expatriate sportspeople
Tersana SC players
Stade Gabèsien players
Al-Mina'a SC players
Tunisian Ligue Professionnelle 1 players
Expatriate footballers in Egypt
Expatriate footballers in Tunisia
Expatriate footballers in Iraq
Libyan expatriate sportspeople in Egypt
Libyan expatriate sportspeople in Tunisia
Libyan expatriate sportspeople in Iraq
Libya international footballers